André Marques (born September 24, 1979) is a Brazilian actor, TV host and entertainer.

As an actor, his first important role on TV was the high school student Mocotó in the soap opera Malhação.

He hosted the TV show Video Show at Globo TV.

In July 2009, it was confirmed he had been contaminated by swine flu during a trip to Argentina. André Marques was probably the first Brazilian celebrity contaminated in the 2009 global outbreak.

References

External links
 

Living people
1979 births
Brazilian male television actors
Brazilian male telenovela actors
Brazilian television presenters
Male actors from Rio de Janeiro (city)